Philip Cairns (born 1 September 1973) disappeared on the afternoon of 23 October 1986 while walking back to school in south Dublin, Ireland. The 13-year-old schoolboy left his home in Ballyroan to return to school, but has not been seen since. A large-scale investigation was carried out but no trace of the boy has ever been found. His disappearance is now treated as a high-profile child murder case, the only similar incident in Ireland being the murder of Robert Holohan in January 2005. It is one of the most high-profile disappearances in recent Irish history.

Philip's family have issued numerous appeals for information. A reconstruction took place in 2007 and was later televised on RTÉ One, while a reward of €10,000 has also been offered. The book, When Heaven Waits, published in 2007, featured an interview with Philip's mother. Nobody has ever been arrested. The case remains open.

Disappearance 

Philip Cairns disappeared while returning to school in Rathfarnham. He had departed Coláiste Éanna secondary school at 12:45 to go home for lunch. He left his home at 13:30 to return to Coláiste Éanna. There have been no confirmed sightings of the boy since. His family believe he was abducted by someone who knew him personally.

Speculation at his school the day after his disappearance had Philip being kidnapped by a "bad man" who had offered him sweets then lured him into a van.

Investigation 
Several hundred Garda Síochána officers and divers took part in a large-scale search of forests, lakes, mountains and rivers. Psychics and clairvoyants were called in to assist. Posters were distributed by milk companies. Cairns' classmates were interviewed by Gardaí at the school during their mid-term holiday break the following week.

Six days after his disappearance, Philip's school bag was located by two girls in an alley close to his house. The lane had already been searched, and the bag was not there at that time. The school bag was thought to hold vital clues, but nothing is known of how it came to be in the lane. It is thought the bag had been left there a short time previously. It was examined forensically but no clues were located. Philip's implements, including pens, pencils, copybook, maths textbook, school journal and his pencil case were within. Some of Philip's books were missing, including a geography book and two religion books. A forensic examination produced no clues as to Philip's whereabouts. Gardaí have sealed the bag and it is now locked in a safe.

Over 400 sightings were reported in the aftermath of the boy's disappearance. In one, Philip was reportedly seen in Manchester in the United Kingdom after his disappearance. Each sighting was seriously investigated, but none led to Philip.

Philip's parents appeared regularly on the news and clutched what has now become a well-recognised picture of a smiling Philip in his confirmation clothes of a blue jacket and a red rosette. This photo has been deemed a precursor to that of British infant Madeleine McCann, who disappeared in Portugal 21 years later. However, the family, unlike the McCanns, have been relatively private about their loss, speaking to the media on only a few occasions in the past 25 years. It has been reported that this is due to several inaccurate reports of the incident of which they have disapproved. Gardaí have, however, praised the media as a proven method for encouraging people to come forward with further information on the case each time an appeal is broadcast. Residents' organisation ACRA also launched an intense campaign to attempt to find Philip.

Several theories have been reported by the media, most of which have been discounted by investigators. These have ranged from death by accident to Philip having been taken by extremists such as paedophiles and Satanists. One theory had a woman tell gardaí that her partner, an alleged paedophile, had killed Philip after abducting him. This was later declared a false allegation.

Detectives based at Rathfarnham Garda Station have been reinvestigating the disappearance of Philip Cairns for several years. Several searches of land have been carried out in the years since the disappearance, often without the media being informed.

In October 2006, the Cairns family issued an appeal for information on the twentieth anniversary of the disappearance. They said they had not given up all hope of finding him alive. A special Mass was also held to mark the occasion. A further appeal for information was launched following the twenty-first anniversary of Philip's disappearance in 2007, when it emerged that over 50 people had approached investigators individually and had provided new lines of inquiry. That month saw a reconstruction of Philip's typical school route being broadcast on RTÉ One's Crimecall television series and the Irish Crimestoppers Trust offering a €10,000 reward for information. Within one day, over 80 people had been in contact with Gardaí or Crimestoppers in what was described as a "tremendous response".

In May 2009, a stretch of private, wooded south Dublin land near a golf club on the M50 motorway was searched by investigators. On 6 May, the area was sealed off and vegetation was cleared. Specialist equipment and finger tip examination techniques were used in an attempt to detect evidence of soil movement. A second search was carried out around 50 metres away later that month. An elderly woman from Dublin told Gardaí that Cairns was murdered and later buried at both sites. She said that a man she was in a relationship with some time before had confessed to killing Philip. Despite the involvement of geophysicists, the searches both proved to be a failure. The man is now a pensioner who lives in Rathfarnham, and cannot be charged due to lack of evidence.

2016 investigation
In May 2016 a woman contacted Gardaí to tell them that she suspected former DJ and convicted paedophile Eamonn Cooke of having killed Philip Cairns. Gardaí questioned Cooke and he was reported to have confirmed some details, but not to have revealed the location of Philip's body. He died in June 2016.

In August 2016 it was announced that DNA samples taken from Philips' schoolbag did not match Cooke, but he had not been ruled out as a suspect. Gardaí also sought to identify two people who may have left Philips' schoolbag in the laneway.

Family 
Philip's mother is Alice Cairns and his father was Philip Cairns, Snr. Alice is a grandmother now and lights a candle each evening in memory of her missing son. Philip has four sisters, Mary, Sandra, Helen and Suzanne. Sandra and Suzanne are active in organisations promoting missing children. He has one younger brother, Eoin, who was 11 years of age when Philip disappeared. Eoin has spoken of his memories of Philip which include childhood games of soccer, fishing and hurling.

His father, Phil, died on 6 July 2014 at Tallaght Hospital.

Impact
The disappearance of Philip Cairns affected the entire country. The case was particularly unusual because it happened in the early afternoon and prompted parents to fear for the safety of their children, even in broad daylight.

See also
List of people who disappeared

References

External links
 "Philip Cairns 'was killed to protect his sex abuser'", 2002 newspaper article

1986 murders in the Republic of Ireland
1980s missing person cases
Crime in Dublin (city)
Missing person cases in Ireland
Unsolved murders in Ireland
1980s in Dublin (city)
October 1986 events in Europe
Incidents of violence against boys